Boulari Bay or Baie de Boulari is a bay in southwestern New Caledonia. It forms the stretch of water to the east of Noumea.

References

Bays of New Caledonia